Kim Osorio (born June 14, 1974 in The Bronx, New York City) is an American journalist, writer, author, TV producer and personality. She was also a cast member on the American reality TV series, "The Gossip Game" on VH1.

Life and career

Early life and education
Osorio was born in New York City to a Puerto Rican father and a mother of mixed racial background, African-American and Chinese American. She was raised in the Castle Hill section of the Bronx where she identified with Hip Hop culture in its early years and often speaks about the influence that its had on her life. After obtaining a B.A. in Fine Arts from Fordham University, she went on to earn a Juris Doctor from New York Law School. Osorio pursued a writing career after law school, going on to write primarily about hip hop music for music publications, such as Billboard, The Source, Vibe, OneWorld and XXL magazine. In 2000, Osorio began working at the Source magazine as the Associate Music Editor and after two years, was appointed to the position of Editor-In-Chief.

The Source
As the first female Editor-in-Chief in the history of the publication, she was featured on the cover of the New York Posts Tempo section, and voted one of the Top 25 influential Latinos in New York. She was called upon by mainstream news outlets such as The O’Reilly Factor, and Fox News’ The Big Story with John Gibson, to represent hip hop culture, and began a lengthy resume as a talking head for a long list of pop culture television specials on networks such as MTV, VH1, BET, E!, Fuse, and TV One.

Under Osorio's leadership, the magazine boasted its two highest selling issues to date, September 2002 featuring Jay-Z and his Roc-a-fella roster and October 2002 featuring Ja Rule and Murder Inc. During her time at the magazine, Osorio interviewed and wrote cover stories on a number of high profile artists, including Jay-Z, Drake, LL Cool J, Rick Ross, The Wu-Tang Clan, Lil Kim, Foxy Brown, and Mase.

In March 2005, Osorio filed a harassment complaint with the magazine's Human Resources department and was terminated shortly after. In response, she filed a federal lawsuit against The Source alleging sexual harassment, gender discrimination, defamation, retaliatory discharge, and maintaining a hostile work environment. The case went on for six days, with the jury returning a verdict in her favor. The judgment, originally reported at 15.5 Million, was later disputed and knocked down to 8 Million.

After entertainment attorney L. Londell McMillan acquired the magazine in 2009 purchasing the 3.75M of the Source Magazine's debt, he re-hired Osorio. "In addition to hip hop, she has empowered women and writers in journalism for years. She is an excellent journalist online and off," said McMillan.  Osorio returned to The Source as Editor-in-Chief in 2012 to help restore the magazine's credibility  and solidify the brand's place in the Hip Hop arena. She left in 2013, to pursue a career full time in television.

Television

While the lawsuit was ongoing in 2005–2006, Osorio accepted a job as the Executive Editor at BET.com. At BET, she transitioned from writer to producer, and served as on-air talent for BET News briefs and their weekly show The Black Carpet. Upon her departure from BET, she began to freelance for the cable network as a script writer, adding shows like Aaliyah: One in a Million, Notarized: The Top 100 Songs of 2011, and the BET Awards special The Chosen to her resume.

Kimberly Osorio then became an editor-at-large at BET Interactive, an affiliate of Black Entertainment Television. In the summer of 2008, Osorio left BET.com to be the VP of Content at Global Grind, where she spent four months before returning to BET.com.

As a script writer, Osorio wrote host scripts for live and live to tape TV specials, including the Love and Hip Hop reunion specials, VH1’s Hip Hop Honors, and various BET tentpole specials.

Osorio transitioned to non-scripted television in 2015, and has gone on to Executive Produce reality television shows such as Love and Hip Hop, Black Ink Chicago,  Growing Up Hip Hop, Hustle In Brooklyn and Hustle & Soul.

Books 

In September 2008, Osorio released a book titled Straight From The Source: An Exposé from the Former Editor in Chief of the Hip-Hop Bible detailing the events of her time at The Source.

Osorio is an invited speaker at various universities across the country as well as industry conferences, sharing both her personal and professional experiences with the masses. She has also served as Principal For A Day at high schools and elementary schools in the Bronx through the PENCIL  organization.

The Source Magazine lawsuit

Allegations
Osorio filed her report to the Equal Employment Opportunity Commission (EEOC) in 2005 with fellow employee, ex-marketing VP Michelle Joyce, outlining their case of sexual harassment. The jury rejected the case brought forth by Michelle Joyce, but Osorio's case went ahead. It is now known that as early as 2004, Osorio began talking to lawyers regarding the merits of her case.  The affidavit filed with the EEOC detailed the work environment at The Source, as well as threats and conduct of workers. Osorio soon after sent an e-mail to the magazine's Human Resources department outlining her complaint, and after refusing to withdraw her e-mail she was fired. Her employers claimed it was because of poor performance, particularly her decisions on magazine covers and certain negative reviews of artists' CDs.

Trial
Osorio outlined the environment which was present at the magazine: employees often watched pornographic movies, hung pictures of females in G-strings, smoked pot and called women bitches.  She also claimed that rumors constantly were made detailing untrue stories of her being sexually involved with industry artists.

The trial lasted 8 days, with Scott being asked to leave, or threatened with removal from the courtroom by Judge Jed S. Rakoff.  The Source filed for bankruptcy protection shortly before the verdict was handed down.  Kenneth P. Thompson, who represented Osorio in her case, commented that he was not worried about the filing because, "They're still a viable company."

After 2 weeks, a jury of six men and two women concluded that while Osorio had not been a victim of sexual harassment, the co-founders of The Source, David Mays and Scott, had in fact terminated her in retaliation, and that Scott had defamed her character in an interview. The total judgement was $7.5 million. "This verdict shows that all women must be treated with dignity and respect, no matter what industry they work in," attorney Thompson said.

Aftermath of trial
On November 1, 2006, Judge Rakoff rejected the appeals of Mays, Scott and The Source.

The Gossip Game

Kim Osorio was a main cast member on the VH1 reality TV show, The Gossip Game. The show followed the careers and personal lives of seven female media professionals working in the urban entertainment industry as radio personalities, journalists, and bloggers. The seven cast members are Vivian Billings, K. Foxx, JasFly, Sharon Carpenter, Candice Williams, and Angela Yee. The show focused on the competitive nature of media coverage of entertainment industry, as well as the particular difficulties female media professionals face when working in a male-dominated field.

The show was produced by VH1 in conjunction with Magilla Entertainment, Mona Scott-Young, and District Media. The Gossip Game consisted of eight episodes, with the premiere airing on VH1 on April 1, 2013.

Filmography

Television

References

External links
Official Site

Original transcript of complaint @ SOHH.com
Kim Osorio Named Editor In Chief Of The Source Magazine
Interview with ThatsHipHop.Com
Beyonce Covers Jones Magazine
V Exclusive Chris Rock Interview
Kim Osorio Speaks: Interview with BlackPressRadio.com
Interview with HipHopRuckus.Com
Interview on DubCNN.com

1974 births
Living people
American magazine editors
People from the Bronx
American music journalists
American television journalists
Women writers about music
Journalists from New York City
American women non-fiction writers
Women magazine editors
American women television journalists
21st-century American women